Williamtown is a rural suburb of the Port Stephens local government area in the Hunter Region of New South Wales, Australia. It is located on the main road between Newcastle and Nelson Bay.

Geography
The eastern section of Williamtown is dominated by RAAF Base Williamtown and Newcastle Airport while the western section of the area is primarily semi-rural with some large-acreage residential areas scattered along Cabbage Tree Road which is a main access route to Port Stephens from the Pacific Highway. To the south Williamtown reaches Fullerton Cove, a large cove at the Hunter River. The south-eastern corner of the area reaches the Tasman Sea on Stockton Beach and access to the beach is possible at this point for off-road vehicles via Lavis Lane.

Population
In the 2016 Census, there were 885 people in Williamtown. 70.9% of people were born in Australia and 80.7% of people spoke only English at home. The most common responses for religion was Anglican at 22.8%.

Tomago sandbeds
Most of Williamtown sits atop the Tomago sandbeds (an aquifer that is a critical source of water for the lower Hunter Region). The sandbeds are replenished primarily by rain as well as any water that leaks from Grahamstown Dam in nearby Ferodale. Water from the sandbeds and the dam is treated in Tomago.

Notes

References

Suburbs of Port Stephens Council
Beaches of New South Wales